Iwao Tokito (born 1908, date of death unknown) was a Japanese water polo player. He competed in the men's tournament at the 1932 Summer Olympics.

References

1908 births
Year of death missing
Japanese male water polo players
Olympic water polo players of Japan
Water polo players at the 1932 Summer Olympics
Sportspeople from Hokkaido